Nashville, Chattanooga & St. Louis Railway Co. v. United States, 113 U.S. 261 (1885), regarded a suit brought by the United States against a railroad company, Nashville, Chattanooga and St. Louis Railway, to recover monies paid for delivery of United States mail in Tennessee from March 31 to June 8, 1861.

Justice Gray delivered the opinion of the court, which stated:

The judgment was affirmed.

See also
List of United States Supreme Court cases, volume 113

References

External links
 

United States Supreme Court cases
United States Supreme Court cases of the Waite Court
1885 in United States case law
Louisville and Nashville Railroad
Railway litigation in 1885